Vayda-Guba is a rural locality (an inhabited locality) in Pechengsky District of Murmansk Oblast, Russia, located beyond the Arctic Circle on the Rybachy Peninsula at a height of  above sea level. Population: 94 (2010 Census).

History
Vayda-Guba was founded in the 1860s when the Murman Coast was actively being settled. From 1920 to 1940 the border of Finland and Soviet Union ran through the village. The western side was Finland and eastern side Soviet Union. The population in 1939 was 141.

Climate
Vayda-Guba has a subarctic climate (Dfc) with cool, wet summers and very cold winters lasting most of the year.

References

Notes

Sources

Rural localities in Murmansk Oblast

